Sir Hugh Eyre Campbell Beaver, KBE (4 May 1890 – 16 January 1967) was an English-South African civil engineer, industrialist, and founder of the Guinness World Records (then known as Guinness Book of Records).

Biography 
Beaver spent two years in the Indian police from 1910 and returned to England in 1921, joining the civil engineering firm Sir Alexander Gibb & Partners, as the personal assistant of Sir Alexander Gibb. During World War II he was Director-General in the newly formed Ministry of Works. 

He died of heart failure in London on 16th January 1967.

Air pollution work 
After the Great Smog of 1952 he was appointed as chair of the Committee on Air Pollution, known as the Beaver Committee, investigating the severe air pollution problem in London. In 1954 the committee reported results which led to effective action, in part due to a shift in public opinion.

References

External links
History of the Guinness World Records - Official Site
Catalogue of the papers of Sir Hugh Beaver at London School of Economics Archives
Portrait at the National Portrait gallery

1890 births
1967 deaths
People from Johannesburg
People educated at Wellington College, Berkshire
Businesspeople awarded knighthoods
Knights Bachelor
Knights Commander of the Order of the British Empire
Indian Police Service officers in British India
Presidents of the Royal Statistical Society
South African emigrants to the United Kingdom
20th-century English businesspeople